There are at least 171 members of the caper, mignonette and mustard order, Capparales, found in Montana.  Some of these species are exotics (not native to Montana) and some species have been designated as Species of Concern.

Capers
Family: Capparaceae
Cleome lutea, yellow beeplant
Cleome serrulata, Rocky Mountain beeplant
Polanisia dodecandra, common clammyweed

Mignonette
Family: Resedaceae
Reseda lutea, yellow mignonette

Mustards

Family: Brassicaceae

Alyssum desertorum, desert alyssum
Alyssum parviflorum, alyssum
Barbarea orthoceras, American winter-cress
Berteroa incana, hoary false-alyssum
Boechera calderi, Calder's rockcress
Boechera collinsii, Collins' rockcress
Boechera demissa, daggett rockcress
Boechera divaricarpa, hybrid rockcress
Boechera pauciflora, elegant rockcress
Boechera pendulocarpa, dropseed rockcress
Boechera sparsiflora, elegant rockcress
Boechera stricta, Drummond's rockcress
Brassica juncea, Chinese mustard
Brassica nigra, black mustard
Brassica rapa, field mustard
Capsella bursa-pastoris, common shepherd's purse
Cardamine breweri, Brewer's bittercress
Cardamine oligosperma, few-seed bittercress
Cardamine oligosperma var. kamtschatica
Cardamine rupicola, cliff toothwort
Chorispora tenella, common blue-mustard
Conringia orientalis, hare's-ear mustard
Descurainia sophia, herb sophia
Draba aurea, golden draba
Draba cana, hoary draba
Draba daviesiae, bitterroot draba
Draba densifolia, dense-leaf draba
Draba oligosperma, few-seed whitlow-grass
Draba reptans, Carolina whitlow-grass
Draba stenoloba, Alaska whitlow-grass
Erucastrum gallicum, common dogmustard
Hesperis matronalis, dame's rocket
Hornungia procumbens, hutchinsia
Isatis tinctoria, dyer's woad
Lepidium campestre, field pepper-grass
Lepidium densiflorum, dense-flower pepper-grass
Lepidium densiflorum var. densiflorum, common pepperweed
Lepidium densiflorum var. pubecarpum, babyseed pepperweed
Lepidium latifolium, broad-leaf pepper-grass
Lepidium perfoliatum, clasping pepper-grass
Lepidium ramosissimum, branched pepper-grass
Lepidium ramosissimum var. bourgeauanum, Bourgeau's pepper-grass
Lepidium sativum, garden pepper-grass
Lepidium virginicum var. medium, intermediate pepperweed
Lepidium virginicum var. pubescens, hairy pepperweed
Malcolmia africana, African adder's-mouth
Physaria arenosa, Great Plains bladderpod
Physaria brassicoides, double bladderpod
Physaria curvipes, curved bladderpod
Physaria didymocarpa, common twinpod
Physaria douglasii, Douglas bladderpod
Physaria geyeri, Geyer's twinpod
Physaria humilis, bitterroot bladderpod
Physaria klausii, divide bladderpod
Physaria pulchella, beautiful bladderpod
Physaria saximontana, Fremont County twinpod
Raphanus sativus, garden radish
Rorippa austriaca, Austrian yellowcress
Rorippa curvisiliqua, curve-pod yellowcress
Rorippa palustris, bog yellowcress
Rorippa palustris subsp. hispida, hispid yellowcress
Rorippa palustris var. fernaldiana, Fernald's yellowcress
Rorippa sylvestris, creeping yellowcress
Sinapis arvensis, corn mustard
Sisymbrium officinale, hairy-pod hedge-mustard
Smelowskia calycina, alpine smelowskia
Stanleya pinnata, desert prince's-plume
Stanleya pinnata var. integrifolia, golden prince's-plume
Stanleya pinnata var. pinnata, desert prince's-plume
Stanleya viridiflora, green prince's-plume
Thelypodium integrifolium, entireleaf thelypody
Thlaspi arvense, field pennycress

Further reading

See also
 List of dicotyledons of Montana

Notes

Montana
Montana